Ramnarine is a surname of Indian origin. Notable people with the surname include:

Dinanath Ramnarine (born 1975), Trinidadian cricketer 
Ria Ramnarine (born 1978), Trinidadian boxer

References

Surnames of Indian origin